Angelo Acerbi (born 23 September 1925) is an Italian prelate of the Catholic Church, who has been an archbishop since 1974 and served in the diplomatic service of the Holy See as the Apostolic Nuncio to New Zealand, the Netherlands, Colombia, Hungary, and Moldova.

Biography
Angelo Acerbi was born in Sesta Godano on 23 September 1925. On 27 March 1948, he was ordained a priest for the Diocese of La Spezia.

After earning a degree in canon law, he obtained his license in theology. Having completed the course of study at the Pontifical Ecclesiastical Academy in 1954, he entered the diplomatic service of the Holy See.

He worked in the nunciatures in Colombia, Brazil, Japan and France, as well as in the International Relations Department of the Holy See's Secretariat of State. In March 1974, he was sent on a mission to Spain to ease church-state tensions over a sermon circulated by Bishop Antonio Añoveros Ataún of Bilbao advocating greater freedom for Spain's Basques.

On 22 June 1974, Pope Paul VI appointed him Archbishop of Zella in Tunisia, and apostolic pronuncio to New Zealand and apostolic delegate to the Pacific Ocean. He received the episcopal ordination on 30 June from Pope Paul, co-consecrators archbishops Giovanni Benelli, deputy for the General Affairs of the Secretariat of State, and Duraisamy Simon Lourdusamy, secretary of the Congregation for the Evangelization of Peoples. On 6 February 1979, he was named Apostolic Pro-Nuncio to Fiji as well.

On 14 August 1979 Pope John Paul II appointed him apostolic nuncio to Colombia. On 27 February 1980, Acerbi was taken hostage along with more than a dozen other diplomats and more than forty others, when communist guerillas belonging to the 19th of April Movement assaulted the embassy of the Dominican Republic in Bogota. He was one of the last released in Havana on 28 April. Acerbi was allowed to celebrate Mass daily in captivity.

On 28 March 1990, he was transferred to Hungary, the first apostolic nuncio to be named after the establishment of Communism in that country. During Acerbi's diplomatic assignment in Hungary, the Holy See concluded an agreement with the Republic of Hungary on religious assistance to the Armed Forces and the Border Police and prepared another relating to the financing of public and other purely religious activities carried out by the Catholic Church in Hungary, in particular the financing of educational activities, which was signed shortly after the end of Acerbi's tenure in Hungary. On 13 January 1994 he was also appointed Apostolic Nuncio in Moldova. On 8 February 1997 he was transferred to the nunciature in the Netherlands.  On 27 February 2001, Pope John Paul II named François Bacqué to succeed him in that position, ending his career as an active nuncio.

On 2 June 2001, Pope John Paul named Acerbi to two curial positions, member of the Congregation for the Evangelization of Peoples and member of the council of cardinals and bishops for the Section for Relations with States of the Secretariat of State. On 4 April 2002, the pope added membership in the Congregation for Bishops. 

On 21 June 2001, he was appointed prelate of the Sovereign Military Order of Malta, tasked with overseeing the priestly life of its chaplains and assisting the Order's leaders in promoting the religious observance of its members. On 21 January 2006, Acerbi denounced the comments published in the Italian weekly Panorama a month earlier, which said that Acerbi was leading a faction of young adherents of the Order dissatisfied its failure to emphasize  its Christian identity. On 4 July 2015, Pope Francis appointed a new prelate, Monsignor Jean Laffitte.

Acerbi is scheduled to lead a spiritual meditation during the triennial gathering of the Holy See's diplomats in September 2022.

See also
 List of heads of the diplomatic missions of the Holy See

References

1925 births
Living people
20th-century Italian Roman Catholic archbishops
 Pontifical Ecclesiastical Academy alumni
Apostolic Nuncios to Colombia
Apostolic Nuncios to Hungary
Apostolic Nuncios to Moldova
Apostolic Nuncios to the Netherlands
Apostolic Nuncios to New Zealand
Apostolic Nuncios to Fiji
Apostolic Nuncios to the Pacific Ocean
People from the Province of La Spezia
21st-century Italian Roman Catholic archbishops